The National Prize for Education Sciences was created in 1979 and is awarded every two years, in accordance with Law 19169 of 1992. It is part of the National Prize of Chile granted by the Ministry of Education.

The jury electing the winner is formed by the Minister of Education, the Rector of the University of Chile, the last awardee, and two professors appointed by the Council of Rectors among the universities that deliver the Bachelor of Science in Education. The floating members of the jury are announced in the month of July of the year of the contest.

The prize consists of a diploma, a cash prize of about 17 million pesos and a lifetime pension of 20  (approximately US$1,600).

Winners
 1979, Roberto Munizaga Aguirre
 1981, 
 1983, Luis Gómez Catalán
 1985, José Valentín Herrera González
 1987, Marino Pizarro Pizarro
 1989, Eliodoro Cereceda Arancibia
 1991, Viola Soto Guzmán
 1993, Ernesto Livacic
 1995, 
 1997, Gabriel Castillo Inzulza
 1999, Patricio Cariola Barroilhet
 2001, Hernán Vera Lamperein
 2003, Mabel Condemarín
 2005, Héctor Gutiérrez Muñoz
 2007, Ernesto Schiefelbein Fuenzalida
 2009, 
 2011, 
 2013, 
 2015, 
 2017, Abraham Magendzo Kolstrein

References

External links
 

1979 establishments in Chile
Awards established in 1979
Chilean awards
Education in Chile